Chris Hutchison is an American stage actor, director, teacher and voice actor. The 2011 season is his fifth year as a company member at the Alley Theatre in Houston.

Career
Hutchison holds a B.A. in English from Lafayette College, where he sometimes teaches, and an M.F.A. from the University of Washington. He also teaches acting at the University of Houston.

Theater

Off Broadway
The Second Man (2000)(Keen Company)
Museum (2002) (Keen Company)
The Hasty Heart (2004) (Keen Company)

Alley Theater
During his five years at the Alley Theater, Hutchison has performed in over twenty productions, including A Behanding in Spokane (Mervyn), Mauritius (Dennis), The Lieutenant of Inishmore (Padraic), Death on the Nile (Simon Mostyn), Subject to Fits (Ippolit), Proof (Hal), and A Christmas Carol (Bob Cratchit).

Filmography

Live action
Kill the Poor (2003) (Joel)
Ed, episode "Charity Cases" (2001) (Bruce Kapler)

Anime
Hutchison also does voice-over. He mostly appears in anime titles for ADV Films and Seraphim Digital/Sentai Filmworks.

 Angel Beats! – Fishing Sato (Ep. 7), Naoi's Father (Ep. 6), Vice-Principal
 Appleseed – Lance (Sentai Dub)
 Appleseed Ex Machina – Lance
 Appleseed Alpha – Matthews
 Broken Blade – Bades, Hekella
 Le Chevalier D'Eon – Bestuzhev
 Clannad – Naoyuki Okazaki
 Devil May Cry: The Animated Series – Kerry (Ep. 7)
 Dog & Scissors - Afro Gomez
 Ghost Hound – Genma Saruta
 Guin Saga – Marus, Scaal
 Halo Legends – ONI Commander (Prototype)
 Hiiro no Kakera – Eins
 Horizon in the Middle of Nowhere - Kenji Ito, Narrator
 Kiba – Bakkam
 Legends of the Dark King – Gaoh
 Needless – Kafka (Ep. 16), Nishimura (Ep. 17), Seiichi Obito
 No. 6 – Rikiga
 Red Garden – Kate's Father
 Un-Go – Ittou Ono (Ep. 1), Yajima (Ep. 6, 9)
 Vinland Saga – Gorm
 Xam'd: Lost Memories – Tojiro Kagisu

Personal
Hutchison's brother, Brian Hutchison, is also an actor. Hutchison is married to actress Elizabeth Bunch and has 2 children.

References

External links 
 
 
 Chris Hutchison at Broadway World

Living people
Lafayette College alumni
American male stage actors
American male television actors
American male voice actors
Place of birth missing (living people)
Year of birth missing (living people)
University of Washington alumni
University of Houston faculty
Male actors from Houston